Stevan Nađfeji (born August 16, 1979) is a Serbian professional basketball coach and former player.

Playing career
During his professional career, Nađfeji has played with: Beobanka, Radnički Beograd, Partizan, Ural Great, Verviers-Pepinster, UNICS Kazan, Panellinios (twice), Vizura, Rethymno, Maroussi, Igokea, Panionios, Kolossos Rodou and Dynamic.

In June 2017, Nađfeji announced his retirement from professional basketball.

Yugoslavian national team
Nađfeji played with the junior national teams of the Federal Republic of Yugoslavia. He won the bronze medal at the 1996 FIBA Europe Under-18 Championship, and the gold medal at the 1998 FIBA Europe Under-20 Championship.

Coaching career 
On August 7, 2017, Nađfeji was named an assistant coach for the Dynamic.

Personal life
Nađfeji is the younger brother of Aleksandar Nađfeji, who was also a professional basketball player.

References

External links
Euroleague.net Profile
Eurobasket.com Profile
Greek Basket League Profile
Adriatic League Profile
FIBA Profile

1979 births
Living people
BC UNICS players
KK Beobanka players
KK Igokea players
KK Partizan players
KK Vizura players
KK Dynamic players
Kolossos Rodou B.C. players
Greek Basket League players
Maroussi B.C. players
Panionios B.C. players
PBC Ural Great players
Power forwards (basketball)
Panellinios B.C. players
Rethymno B.C. players
BKK Radnički players
Serbian expatriate basketball people in Belgium
Serbian expatriate basketball people in Bosnia and Herzegovina
Serbian expatriate basketball people in Greece
Serbian expatriate basketball people in Russia
Serbian men's basketball players
Serbian men's basketball coaches
Small forwards
Basketball players from Belgrade